This is a list of horror anthology films.

History 

Dead of Night (1945) helped to popularize the format for horror anthology films—although they had existed as far back as Unheimliche Geschichten(1919) or Waxworks (1924)—and British company Amicus made several such films in the 1960s and 1970s. From Beyond the Grave (1974), Trilogy of Terror (1975), Heavy Metal (1981), Twilight Zone: The Movie (1983), Creepshow (1982), The Company of Wolves (1984), Creepshow 2 (1987), Tales from the Darkside: The Movie (1990) and Tales from the Hood (1995) are various horror themed anthologies from the 70s to the 90s.

List

See also 

 Lists of horror films

References 

anthology